M2SYS Technology is a global biometric identification management company that provides biometric identity management software and hardware along with enterprise software applications to several vertical markets including; public safety, workforce management, point of sale, healthcare, education, child care, transportation security, banking and membership management. They offer Software Development Kits to software vendors that want to add biometric identification to their applications directly to end users.

The name M2SYS is short for “Mind to System” and was coined by CEO Mizan Rahman to describe the flow of development ideas into a tangible, market-ready biometric recognition software engine and ancillary products.

History
M2SYS was incorporated in 2001 as a small software company that developed supply chain software.  As the company evolved in technical innovation, it later developed as fingerprint biometric research and development center after the invention of Bio-Plugin.

M2SYS established its headquarters in Atlanta, Georgia where it continues to operate.  In 2007, they opened an office in Asia located in Dhaka, Bangladesh. In 2013, they opened another office in South America located in Lima, Peru.

Awards

In 2007, the company received the 2007 Biometrics Technology Innovation of the Year Award from Frost & Sullivan.

In the summer of 2010, M2SYS released “Hybrid Biometric Platform,” a client/server biometric software system that supports fingerprint, finger vein, palm vein, and iris recognition.

Subsequently, in 2011 the company was awarded the 2011 North American New Product Innovation Award in the Biometrics industry for "Hybrid Biometric Platform".

In 2013, M2SYS was named a Technology Association of Georgia (TAG) Top 40 Innovative Technology Company.

M2SYS was named as one of the 2014 Top 10 Most Innovative Companies in Georgia by the Technology Association of Georgia (TAG).

M2SYS also received recognition as the 2014 Global Impact Award Winner for international business leadership by the Atlanta Metro Chamber of Commerce.

Key Strategic Partnerships

Fujitsu 
In April 2010, M2SYS created an alliance with Fujitsu Frontech North America designed to offer  PC-based palm vein biometric recognition systems.  Under the partnership, M2SYS added support for the Fujitsu PalmSecure biometric identification system to its Bio-Plugin biometrics platform. This alliance was terminated in March 2015.

KRONOS 
In June 2009, M2SYS established a partnership with KRONOS, to design software that interfaces with KRONOS Workforce Timekeeper.

Hitachi 
M2SYS established a partnership with Hitachi in 2008 to deliver Bio-Plugin biometric identification software technology through the USB Finger Vein Biometric Scanner for market deployment.

Key Products

Bio-Plugin 
Bio-Plugin is a biometrics software program that allows developers to integrate a server-based biometrics system.

Bio-SnapOn 
Bio-SnapOn is a complete biometrics software system that can be added (“snapped-on”) to any third party or internally developed software package, without any development work.

Hybrid Biometric Platform 
Hybrid Biometrics is a multi-modal biometrics system that supports fingerprint, finger vein, palm vein, and iris recognition from a single server.

Bio-Hyperpliance 
Bio-Hyperpliance is a scalable multi-modal biometrics recognition system that leverages distributed node balancing for 1:N identification of large databases.

RightPunch
RightPunch is multi-modal PC-based “soft” clock data collection software that can be used with or without biometrics.

RightPatient
RightPatient is a multi-modal biometric identification system designed to identify patients in healthcare to help prevent  misidentification and fraud.

ABIS
ABIS stands for Automated Biometric Identification System and its a software package used to perform a wide variety of tasks for processing, editing, searching, retrieving and storing biometric templates and subject records.

certisID

A "Know Your Customer" (KYC) biometric customer identification application to help the prevention of identity theft, financial fraud, money laundering, or terrorist financing.

M2-FuseID (Hardware)

In late 2013, M2SYS designed and released M2-FuseID - a "smart" multi-modal finger reader that simultaneously captures a fingerprint image and finger vein pattern simultaneously with the single touch of a finger.

References

Biometrics software
Companies established in 2001
Companies based in Atlanta
Forensic equipment